Sanderstead  is a village and medieval-founded church parish at the southern end of Croydon in south London, England, within the London Borough of Croydon, and formerly in the historic county of Surrey, until 1965. It takes in Purley Downs and Sanderstead Plantation, an area of woodland that includes the second-highest point in London. Sanderstead sits above a dry valley at the edge of the built-up area of Greater London. Cementing its secular identity from the late 19th century until abolition in 1965 it had a civil parish council. The community had a smaller farming-centred economy until the mid 19th century.

All Saints' Church's construction began in about 1230 followed by great alterations and affixing of monuments including a poem attributed to John Dryden, the first Poet Laureate nationally; it is protected under UK law as Grade I listed. Sanderstead station is at the foot of the dry valley and has frequent, fast trains to East Croydon, connected to a range of London terminals and interchanges. Sanderstead is claimed to an origin of the English Sanders surname, noting at least four separate geographical clusters formed by the 19th century, two of which were by 1881 far more populous.

Sanderstead's Interwar growth coincided with the electrification of the Southern Railway leaving largely a suburban community of households having at least one commuter to central London or Croydon.

History 

There is evidence of prehistoric human activity in and around Sanderstead.  In 1958–60 the Sanderstead Archaeological Group excavated in the vicinity of Sanderstead pond and revealed the presence of man as far back as the Mesolithic Period nearly 12,000 years ago, as well as pottery fragments dated between 100 AD and 1300 AD and a bronze belt from the end of the Saxon era. North of the village at Croham Hurst, upon a wooded hill, are circular barrows believed to be from a Bronze Age settlement.  This is now part of a public open space and the site is marked by a brass monument.  A Romano-British homestead (small farming settlement) was discovered during the construction of the Atwood School. During the 1980s, when the school was extended, further excavation revealed the remains of several round huts, hearths, a brooch, and pottery, some of which hailed from North Africa.

An Anglo-Saxon reference to Sanderstead can be found in the will, dated 871, of  Alfred, an ealdorman.  The village lay within the Anglo-Saxon administrative division of Wallington hundred. It later appears to have been given to St Peter's Abbey, Winchester (Hyde Abbey) by Æthelflæd, the wife of Edgar the Peaceful and mother of Edward the Martyr, where it remained after the Norman Conquest.

Sanderstead appears in the Domesday Book of 1086 as Sandestede, and belonging to St Peter's Abbey, Winchester. It had a noted population (probably of just the adult males) of 26 including 21 villagers, 4 slaves and 1 cottager. Its Domesday assets were assessed as 5 hides, and 10 carucates of arable land. It had 9 ploughs and wood worth 30 hogs. Its Domesday entry records that in the time of Edward the Confessor it was valued at 100 shillings, and now 12 pounds; and yet it produces 15 pounds.

The village was granted to Sir John Gresham by Henry VIII following the Dissolution of the Monasteries. It was passed to his son Richard who subsequently sold it to John Ownsted, the transfer being ratified in 1591. Ownsted died without issue in 1600, and devised his estates to his two sisters and cousin Harman Atwood, with Atwood subsequently purchasing the shares of his joint legatees. The Atwood family had a long association with Sanderstead, with inscriptions at the local church indicating a presence in the village from the reign of Edward II.

The manor house, known as Sanderstead Court, was substantially remodelled by Harman Atwood.  This large country house was probably first constructed in the early sixteenth century. The Atwoods continued to occupy the house until 1778, when it was devised to Atwood Wigsell.  It was turned into a hotel in 1928, and before the Second World War it was used by the Royal Air Force (RAF). It was very badly damaged by fire (not a bomb) in 1944 and was demolished in 1958. One very small part of the hotel building does however still stand. On the site now stands "Sanderstead Court", a three-storey block of flats.

One of the more curious aspects of Sanderstead is that it has no pub, unlike nearby Warlingham which has around six.

On the edge of the village lies the site of the Old Saw Mill now home to a number of private residences and the picturesque setting for Sanderstead Cricket Club. Cricket has been played in the area since the 18th century, with matches recorded in 1731 and 1732. The ground itself has been in use since 1883 and continues to the present day with four teams playing in the Surrey Championship and a number of other Colts and friendly teams.

Located between Limpsfield Road and Kingswood Lane is the large Kings Wood.
It derives its name from a small wood to the north of Kings Wood Lodge. In 1823, Ordnance Survey Maps called the wood Sanderstead Wood, but this might be due to a mistake.
It covers some 147½ acres, criss-crossed by ancient rides and is on relatively flat ground.  It was purchased in 1937 under the Green Belt Act by the local council and is now public open space. There is the site of a Romano-British settlement on the northern boundary, a small farmstead undisturbed for 2000 years.

Education
Sanderstead has four schools, namely; Atwood Primary Academy, Gresham Primary School, Kingsdown Secondary School and Ridgeway Primary School. It is also conveniently placed for a number of others located within a couple of miles from the village including Croydon High School, Harris Academy Purley, Riddlesdown Collegiate, Royal Russell School, The Quest Academy, Thomas More Catholic School, Warlingham School, and Whitgift School.

Demography
In the 2011 census, Sanderstead was White or White British (80.3%), Asian or Asian British (9.5%), Black or Black British (4.4%), Mixed/multiple ethnic groups (3.8%), and  Other ethnic group (0.9%). The largest single ethnicity is White British (76.2%).

The crime rate in 2014/15 in Sanderstead was 29.6, the 7th lowest out of the 628 wards of Greater London.

Politics
Sanderstead has consistently returned Conservative Party MPs to the local seat of Croydon South and has also returned Conservative members to the local council. Since the north of Croydon tends to return Labour councillors, a near-identical split in representation follows. The current MP for Croydon South is Chris Philp.

Sanderstead is one of the twenty-four wards constituting Croydon London Borough Council. Three councillors are elected every four years to represent the ward on the council. The current elected Councillors are:

Notable residents
In alphabetical order:
John Atwood (1576–1644), was the Assistant Governor of the Plymouth Colony, in the US state of Massachusetts, in 1638.  His childhood was spent at Sanderstead Court.
Margaret Bondfield (1873–1953), the first woman to sit in Cabinet in the United Kingdom (1929–1931), died in Sanderstead.
Ruth Ellis (1926–1955), the last woman to be executed in the UK, lived on Sanderstead Hill.
Charlie Kray (1933–1995), criminal and elder brother of gangsters Ronald and Reggie Kray, lived for a time in Limpsfield Road in the 1990s.
Laurier Lister (1907–1986), theatre director and producer, was born in the village.
Stephen Rumbold Lushington (1775–1868), lived for a time at Sanderstead Court, and his daughter was born there in 1816. He was Joint Secretary of the Treasury (1824–7), Governor of Madras (1827–32), and MP for Rye (1807–12) and for Canterbury (1812–30).
Kate Moss (born 1974), model, lived at Church Way as a child and teenager. She went to Ridgeway Primary School, then Riddlesdown High School.
Malcolm Muggeridge (1903–1990) was born in Broomhall Road on 24 March 1903.
Hilary Page (1904-1957) was born in Sanderstead. Invented the interlocking plastic brick Kiddicraft.
David Rippingale, aka William Hung, lead singer of I, Ludicrous, spent his formative years in Sanderstead (1958–71).
Tony Sewell (born 1959), educationalist, lives in Sanderstead.

Nearest places
Selsdon
South Croydon
Hamsey Green
Warlingham
Kenley
Purley
Riddlesdown

Nearest railway stations
Sanderstead railway station
Purley Oaks railway station
Riddlesdown railway station

References
Notes

References

External links
 Local guide covering Sanderstead
 Sanderstead Village Community
 History of Sanderstead Village
 Sanderstead Parish (Church of England)
 Sanderstead Evangelical Church
 A gallery of images of Sanderstead

1731 establishments in England
Areas of London
Cricket grounds in Surrey
Defunct cricket grounds in England
Defunct sports venues in Surrey
Districts of the London Borough of Croydon
English cricket venues in the 18th century
Sports venues completed in 1731
Villages in Surrey